Admir Ujkaj (born 15 October 1993) is a professional Albanian footballer who plays as a midfielder for KF Veleçiku in the Albanian First Division.

References

1993 births
Living people
Footballers from Shkodër
Albanian footballers
Association football midfielders
KF Vllaznia Shkodër players
KF Laçi players
KS Veleçiku Koplik players
KS Burreli players
Kategoria Superiore players
Kategoria e Parë players